Herolind Shala (born 1 February 1992) is a professional footballer who plays as a midfielder for Turkish club Erzurumspor FK. Born in Norway, he represents the Kosovo national team. He previously represented Norway at youth and Albania at under-21 and senior international level.

Club career

Sparta Prague
On 11 January 2015, Shala joined Czech First League side Sparta Prague. On 23 February 2015, he made his debut in a 4–1 home win against Příbram after being named in the starting line-up.

Lyngby
On 30 August 2017, Shala joined Danish Superliga side Lyngby. On 19 November 2017, he made his debut in a 3–1 home defeat against Randers after coming on as a substitute at 69th minute in place of Martin Ørnskov.

Start
On 4 August 2018, Shala joined with the newly promoted team of Eliteserien side Start, on a season-long contract. On 6 August 2018, he made his debut in a 4–1 away defeat against Brann after coming on as a substitute at 70th minute in place of Tobias Christensen.

Vålerenga
On 11 February 2019, Shala joined Eliteserien side Vålerenga, on a two-year contract. On 30 March 2019, he made his debut in a 2–0 home win against Mjøndalen after being named in the starting line-up.

Stabæk
On 5 March 2021, Shala joined Eliteserien side Stabæk. On 19 May 2021, he made his debut against his former club Odd after being named in the starting line-up and assists in his side's two goals during a 2–2 home draw.

Erzurumspor
On 9 September 2021, Stabæk announced the transfer of Shala to TFF First League club Erzurumspor FK. That same day, the club confirmed that Shala's transfer was permanent.

International

Norway
From 2009, until 2012, Shala has been part of Norway at youth international level, respectively has been part of the U17 and U21 teams and he with these teams played three matches, which were friendly matches.

Albania

Under-21

In May 2013. When he was called up for both the Norwegian and the Albanian under-21 team, he withdrew from the Norwegian squad as he wanted to represent Albania instead. On 11 July 2013, he made his debut for the Albanian U-21 team against Bosnia and Herzegovina U21 by playing full 90-minutes.

On 5 March 2014, he was called up for the closing match of the 2015 UEFA European Under-21 qualification against Austria. He played as a starter and scored the last goal for his side in the 57th minute, where the match finished in an away 1–3 victory with other goals scored by Enis Gavazaj and Vasil Shkurti.

Senior
On 7 September 2014, Shala received his first senior national team call-up by the Albania national football team coach Gianni De Biasi for the UEFA Euro 2016 qualifying match against Portugal. On 14 November 2014, he made his debut for senior team in the "Group I" Friendly Match against the Euro 2016 hosts, France, by coming on as a substitute in the 76th minute. In the other match against Italy, he played once again as a substitute at this time in the 71st minute.

Kosovo
On 30 August 2016, Shala received a call-up from Kosovo for a 2018 FIFA World Cup qualification match against Finland. On 6 October 2016, he made his debut with Kosovo in a 2018 FIFA World Cup qualification match against Croatia after coming on as a substitute at 77th minute in place of Arbër Zeneli.

Personal life
Shala was born in Porsgrunn, Norway to Kosovo Albanian parents from Drenas.

Career statistics

Club

International

Honours
Odd
Norwegian Cup runner-up: 2014

References

External links

1992 births
Living people
Shala (tribe)
People from Drenas
people from Porsgrunn
Dual internationalists (football)
Kosovan footballers
Association football midfielders
Kosovo international footballers
Kosovan expatriate footballers
Kosovan expatriate sportspeople in the Czech Republic
Kosovan expatriate sportspeople in Turkey
Kosovan expatriate sportspeople in Denmark
Albanian footballers
Albania under-21 international footballers
Albania international footballers
Albanian expatriate footballers
Albanian expatriate sportspeople in the Czech Republic
Albanian expatriate sportspeople in Turkey
Albanian expatriate sportspeople in Denmark
Norwegian footballers
Norway youth international footballers
Norwegian expatriate footballers
Norwegian expatriate sportspeople in the Czech Republic
Norwegian expatriate sportspeople in Turkey
Norwegian expatriate sportspeople in Denmark
Norwegian people of Kosovan descent
Norwegian people of Albanian descent
Norwegian First Division players
Notodden FK players
Eliteserien players
Odds BK players
IK Start players
Vålerenga Fotball players
Stabæk Fotball players
Czech First League players
AC Sparta Prague players
FC Slovan Liberec players
Süper Lig players
Kasımpaşa S.K. footballers
Danish Superliga players
Lyngby Boldklub players
TFF First League players
Büyükşehir Belediye Erzurumspor footballers